Marico Limited is an Indian multinational consumer goods company providing consumer products and services in the areas of health, beauty and wellness. With its headquarters in Mumbai, Marico is present in over 25 countries across Asia and Africa. It owns brands in categories of hair care, skin care, edible oils, health foods, male grooming, and fabric care.

As of 2019–2020, the company generated a turnover of ₹7,315 crores. Marico has 8 factories in India located at Puducherry, Perundurai, Kanjikode, Jalgaon, Paldhi, Dehradun, Baddi and Paonta Sahib.

Leadership 
Harsh Mariwala is the chairman and Saugata Gupta assumed the role of the managing director in March 2014 and is currently the MD and CEO of this organisation.

History 
Marico Limited was established on 13 October 1988 under the name of Marico Foods Limited. Later, in 1989 the name of the company was changed from Marico Foods Limited to Marico Industries Limited. The first International office for Marico was set up in Dubai in year 1992. Marico was first listed on Indian stock exchange in 1996.
Timeline
 1974 – Harsh Mariwala envisioned a branded FMCG market for coconut and refined edible oils in small consumer packs and sets up a national distribution network for Parachute.
 1990 – Marico was established in India.
 1991 – Marico launches Hair & Care, a non-sticky hair oil repositioning the market leader through contemporary packaging. Sweekar sunflower oil goes national.
 1992 to 94 – Marico goes from being an exporter to international marketer – sets up its first overseas office in Dubai.
 1994 – The year marks another innovation, Revive cold water starch makes starching cottons more convenient for the consumer.
 1996 – Marico lists on the Indian Stock Exchanges.
 1999 – The company expands with its first overseas manufacturing facility in Bangladesh. Marico acquires Mediker in the same year
 2003 – Marico Innovation Foundation, responsible for executing the Corporate Social Responsibility of Marico was formed. In the same year Marico sets up copra collection centres to procure directly from farmers increasing their margins.
 2006 – Nihar enters the Marico fold.
 2006-7 – Marico casts footprint in Africa, acquires Fiancée and Hair Code in Egypt and Caivil, Black Chic and Hercules in South Africa.
 2009 – Marico makes a public offering of equity in Bangladesh; a first for one of its overseas subsidiaries.
 2010 – The year also marks the launch of Saffola breakfast, Masala Oats in India.
 2011 – Parachute Advanced entered the skin-care category with the launch of Parachute Advanced Body Lotion (PABL), another innovation by Marico. The year also marks the launch of Parachute Gold hair cream in the Middle East market targeted to women which today has great equity amongst the consumer. Marico strengthens its presence S.E. Asia through a male grooming, skin care and food portfolio acquired in Vietnam the same year.
 2012 – India's Gen Next gets styled by Marico as it launches its male grooming brand, SetWet.
 2015 – Marico's Market Cap tops ₹25,000 crore.
 2017– Marico acquires South Africa's leading hair styling business – Isoplus; launches Saffola Active Slimming Nutri-shake (marking entry into nutraceuticals category) and makes a strategic investment in Zed Lifestyle (Beardo)
 2018 – Marico invests Revolutionary Fitness (Revofit); launches a new brand – True Roots that delays hair greying and launches its first digital exclusive brand – Studio X; launched Saffola Fittify.
 2019 – Marico announces association with Kaya, to create a skincare sub-brand, Kaya Youth.

Brands 
The organisation holds a number of household brands such as Parachute, Parachute Advanced, Saffola, Hair & Care, Nihar, Nihar Naturals, Livon, Set Wet, Mediker and Revive. In the international market, Marico is represented by brands like Parachute, HairCode, Fiancée, Caivil, Hercules, Black Chic, Code 10, Ingwe, X-Men and Thuan Phat. 
 Male grooming – Set Wet, Beardo, Parachute Advansed Men Aftershower Hair Cream
 Hair Care – Parachute, Parachute Advansed, Nihar Naturals, Nihar Naturals Uttam, Hair & Care Fruit Oils, Mediker, Livon
Edible Oils – Saffola
 Skin Care – Parachute Advansed Body Lotion
 Fabric Care – Revive
 Healthy Foods – Saffola Masala Oats & Saffola Fittify

Parachute

Parachute is the flagship brand of Marico which consists of edible grade coconut oil. Marico manufactures and markets its coconut based hair oils under its brand – Parachute "Advanced" and a series of extensions thereof. Parachute edible oil contains 100% coconut oil, whereas "Advanced" hair oils contain at least 50% mineral oil along with coconut oil.

Others
Saffola is essentially blended refined edible oil. It is marketed under the names of New Saffola, Tasty and Active. All of them contain blended vegetable oils in various ratios. The main type of oils which are blended include Rice bran oil, Kardi oil or Safflower oil, Corn oil and Soya oil.

Marico has a significant presence in Bangladesh, South East Asia, Middle East, Egypt and South Africa. In Bangladesh, Marico operates through Marico Bangladesh Limited, a wholly owned subsidiary. Its manufacturing facility is located at Shirirchala, in Dhaka Division.

Mineral oil in hair oil
Parachute "Advanced" hair oils contain around 50% (v/v) to 80% (v/v) mineral oil, along with coconut oil. Advanced Aloe Vera Enriched Coconut Hair Oil contains: Coconut oil (50% v/v), Mineral l (49.6% v/v), BHT, Aloe Vera extract & Perfume.

Mineral oil is known to cause skin cancer.
Even though highly refined oils (classified as Group 3) are not suspected to be carcinogenic, available information is not sufficient to classify them as harmless.

Shareholding Pattern

Marketing 
NRI in the Middle East had been smuggling Parachute oil with them for their daily use when export of the oil was restricted prior to the 1991 economic liberalisation. Marico decided to try to sell products in that market after liberalisation, but found out that the Arab customers did not like the scent of coconut, wanted a less sticky hair product, and needed a product to counteract the high level of chlorination in their water. When Marico reformulated its product, its market share in the Middle East grew from 2% in 2002 to more than 20% by 2008.

References

Companies based in Mumbai
Indian companies established in 1990
1990 establishments in Maharashtra
Companies listed on the National Stock Exchange of India
Companies listed on the Bombay Stock Exchange
Multinational companies headquartered in India